Haditha (al-Ḥadīthah) is a city in the western Iraqi Al Anbar Governorate, about  northwest of Baghdad. Its population of around 46,500 people, predominantly Sunni Muslim Arabs. The city lies near the Buhayrat al Qadisiyyah, an artificial lake which was created by the building of the Haditha Dam, the largest hydroelectric facility in Iraq.

Politics
Haditha is officially a political district subordinate to the Al Anbar Province.  The Haditha District consists of the Sub-Districts of Haditha [City], the Haqlaniyah Sub-District, and the Barwannah Sub-District.  Each district is governed by a Mayor and a Sub-District Council.  The twenty member sub-district councils elect one of their own to serve as the Council Chairman.  They also employ other municipal managers such as a Municipal Engineer.

Agriculture
The riverbank in the Haditha District is occupied by well irrigated farm plots that produce a large amount of food.  Substantial sheep and goat flocks are also kept in the area.  Further food sources come from fishing the river or the nearby Lake Qadisiya.

Hydroelectric
Entering the Haditha Sub District, one is likely to see municipal signs illustrated with a water wheel.  These are displayed as a reference to the area's history.  Locals suggest that the ancient looking structures on or near the Euphrates River were part of a water wheel structure that dates back to a period of Roman occupation.  They claim locals built water wheels to establish a limited aqueduct system similar to the one that served Rome.  Whether or not soldiers or citizens of the Roman Empire ever resided in Haditha is an open question.

Iraq War

The Haditha Dam and surrounding areas were initially secured by U.S. troops in April 2003 as part of the invasion of Iraq. An attack on the dam would have severely flooded towns along the Euphrates downstream from Haditha, as well as eliminating an important source of electricity.

On July 16, 2003 Mohammed Nayil Jurayfi, mayor of Haditha, and his youngest son, Ahmed, were assassinated.

In 2004, U.S. troops left a local police force in charge of the city and insurgents rounded up dozens of local police officers and publicly executed them in a soccer stadium.

In May 2005, U.S. forces launched Operation New Market in Haditha against the insurgents controlling the city. However, resistance continued. On August 1, 2005, an ambush killed 6 United States Marine snipers, (who were operating in two two-man teams with an additional marine per team for security) in the city; on August 3, a roadside bomb killed another 14 Marines and their interpreter.

According to an August 2005 report by The Guardian, the town was controlled by insurgents, with US forces making only fleeting visits every few months. Like Al-Qa'im, it had come under a Taliban-like rule, with Western-style items banned and insurgents collecting the salaries of government employees. This insurgent dominance has continued into 2006.

The mayor of Haditha in November 2005 was Emad Jawad Hamza.

2005 Haditha Killings

On 19 November 2005, 24 Iraqi noncombatants, including 11 women and children, were killed by 12 Marines from 3rd Battalion, 1st Marines. The US military is investigating these actions, a captain and a lieutenant colonel have been relieved of duty (another captain was relieved on the same day but not for the same incident.) Some allege the massacre was in retribution for an incident earlier in the day in which US Marine Lance Corporal Miguel Terrazas was killed in a roadside bomb attack on Marines from Kilo Company. In August 2006 a commission reviewing the killings found probable cause for charging the Marines. The same day, one of the accused Marines sued Rep. John P. Murtha (D-Pa.) for libel because of Murtha's characterization of the incident saying the Marines killed the civilians "in cold blood." In 2009, a federal appeals court ruled Tuesday that Rep. John Murtha could not be sued for accusing U.S. Marines of murdering Iraqi civilians "in cold blood." The judges ruled that Murtha was immune from the lawsuit because he was acting in his official role as a lawmaker when he made the comments to reporters.

A court-martial on June 4, 2008 acquitted a US Marine for any role in covering up the deaths of 24 civilians in Haditha in Iraq in 2005, while charges were dropped against five other marines in the affair. Lieutenant Andrew Grayson, 27, was declared "not guilty on all charges" by a jury, said a spokesman for the Camp Pendleton military base in southern California where the hearing started on May 28. Grayson had been charged with making false statements and attempting to fraudulently separate from the Marine Corps. He was also charged with obstruction of justice, but the military judge dismissed this charge June 3, 2008.

Charges of murder against squad leader Frank Wuterich were changed to the lesser offense of manslaughter. Wuterich's trial has been delayed due to ongoing litigation regarding the prosecution's access to unaired footage from 60 Minutes interview with Wuterich. Lt Colonel Jeffrey Chessani, the highest-ranking officer accused over the incident, had been charged with dereliction of duty and violation of a lawful order. On June 17, 2008 Military Judge Colonel Steven Folsom dismissed all charges against Lt Colonel Jeffrey Chessani on the grounds that General James Mattis, who approved the filing of charges against Chessani, was improperly influenced by an investigator probing the incident. The ruling was without prejudice, which allows the prosecution to refile.

Recovery and rebuilding 

The change in U.S. strategy in late 2006 brought quick results to the Hadithah Triad. The U.S. Marines and their Iraqi and coalition allies had largely driven out insurgents by the summer of 2007.

Hadithah was much more secure and had recovered some of its prosperity by the summer of 2008. The progress was evident when an American Congressional Delegation visited the town in August and found full shops and friendly people.

With this turbulent history the future was unpredictable. However, according to the website of Multi National Forces – Iraq, progress began after a large berm was erected around the cities of Haditha and Haqlaniyah on the western side of the Euphrates and Barwannah on the East side during Operation Al Majid.

Marine units rotated in and out of the area detaining numerous persons. Iraqi Police were firmly established by 2007 and violence fell. In contrast to previous years, the Ramadan period of 2007 came and went in Haditha with no insurgent attacks.

In the next few months two bridges across the Euphrates were rebuilt, the area hospital was reopened and re-equipped, the K3 Oil refinery south of the area was brought back online, and life began to take on the air of normalcy.

Also planned is keeping the hydro-electric dam functioning and rebuild capacity with the help of US led coalition forces, to re-open a local oil refinery, again with significant funding and technical advice from Coalition forces and provincial reconstruction teams headquartered in Ramadi and Al Asad, to rebuild two dams over the Euphrates River, man a large (and apparently effective) police force, establish regular ambulance service, re-equip and run their hospital, open an asphalt factory, re-open schools with basic refurbishments complete, fill the offices of their local government, expand their local markets, begin rebuilding a local marble factory.

War with ISIL 
In early 2014, ISIL launched a successful campaign to seize around 70% of Anbar province from Iraq. Haditha is notable for being one of the few towns that remained under the control of Iraqi forces despite being more than 200 kilometres from Baghdad. In September 2014, ISIL attacked the dam but were repelled by airstrikes. As of May 2016, it remains one of the most exclusively Sunni Arab towns of Iraq under control of the government.

Al Jazeera's Iraq editor Hamed Hadeed said Haditha plays a major role in the country's conflict because of its strategic location and unparalleled resistance to ISIL:

"Haditha serves as a significant transportation route between the western regions of Anbar, the central province of Salahuddin, and northern governorate of Nineveh. It is also the only city in Anbar province that has been able to block IS's repeated attempts to control it."

Climate
Haditha has a hot desert climate (Köppen climate classification BWh). Most rain falls in the winter. About  of precipitation falls annually.

Notable people 
 Kamal al-Hadithi, (1939 – 2018) poet, journalist and politician.

References

Articles
Marines Exonerated
Case for the Combat Squad Leader

External links

Iraq Image - Haditha Satellite Observation

Populated places in Al Anbar Governorate
Populated places on the Euphrates River
District capitals of Iraq
Cities in Iraq